The BAT F.K.23 Bantam was a British single-seat fighter biplane produced by British Aerial Transport Company Limited of London during World War I.

Design and development
Frederick Koolhoven's first design for the British Aerial Transport Company (BAT) was the F.K.22 single-seat fighter.  It was a two-bay biplane of wooden construction.  It was planned to have a 120 hp (90 kW) A.B.C Mosquito radial engine but the failure of this engine led to the installation of the 170 hp (127 kW) A.B.C.Wasp I in the first and third aircraft.  The second machine was fitted with a 100 hp (75 kW) Gnome Monosoupape rotary engine and was the first to fly at Martlesham Heath in January 1918.  The original contract called for six development aircraft but three aircraft were built as the F.K.23 Bantam I, the second prototype then being renamed the Bantam II.  The Bantam I was the same wooden structure but was slightly smaller.  Two further prototypes of the larger design were also built followed by at least 9 development aircraft.  One aircraft was delivered to the Royal Aircraft Establishment on 26 July 1918, one was delivered to the French at Villacoublay and a further aircraft to the United States Army Air Corps at Wright Field in 1922.

The production Bantam had to be modified due to unsatisfactory spin characteristics of the prototypes.  Continuous engine problems and downsizing of the Royal Air Force were factors in no more orders for the Bantam.  Koolhoven returned to Netherlands with one aircraft where it was re-engined with a 200 hp (149 kW) Armstrong Siddeley Lynx radial engine.  Several examples were operated as civil racing aircraft.

Variants
F.K.22 Bantam I 
Prototypes and evaluation version, 2 built.
F.K.23 Bantam II
Production aircraft, 3 prototypes + 9 aircraft were built.

Operators

French Air Force received 1 aircraft for evaluation.

Koolhoven factory operated 1 aircraft.

Royal Air Force operated 1 aircraft.

United States Army Air Corps received 1 aircraft for evaluation.

Survivors

One aircraft, registered K-123, originally on display at the Aviodome, Netherlands. The airplane was acquired by the Rijksmuseum in Amsterdam.
The remains of a second FK 23 are used to build a flying example. It is a project from the "vroege vogels" from Lelystad in the Netherlands.

Specifications (F.K.23 Bantam)

Notes

References

External links

BAT FK23 Bantam Walkaround photos at IdFlieg.com
 Contemporary technical description of F.K.23 Bantam with photographs and drawings.

1910s British fighter aircraft
Bantam
Biplanes
Single-engined tractor aircraft
Koolhoven aircraft
Aircraft first flown in 1918